František Souček (born 1878, date of death unknown) was a Czech athlete. He competed at the 1906 Intercalated Games and the 1908 Summer Olympics, representing Bohemia.

References

1878 births
Year of death missing
Athletes (track and field) at the 1906 Intercalated Games
Athletes (track and field) at the 1908 Summer Olympics
Czech male discus throwers
Czech male javelin throwers
Olympic athletes of Bohemia
Place of birth missing
Sportspeople from the Austro-Hungarian Empire